Zita Urbonaitė (September 3, 1973 – May 26, 2008) was a female road racing cyclist from Lithuania.

References

1973 births
2008 deaths
Sportspeople from Šiauliai
Lithuanian female cyclists